This is a list of films produced in Sweden and in the Swedish language in the 1960s. For an A-Z see :Category:Swedish films.

1960

1961

1962

1963

1964

1965

1966

1967

1968

1969

External links
 Swedish film at the Internet Movie Database

1960s
Films
Swedish

nl:Lijst van Zweedse films
zh:瑞典電影列表